Stavros Foukaris (born April 15, 1975) is a Cypriot former international football defender.

He started and ended his career with Anorthosis Famagusta. In between, he played on loan at Nea Salamina.

External links
 

1975 births
Living people
Nea Salamis Famagusta FC players
Anorthosis Famagusta F.C. players
Cypriot footballers
Cyprus international footballers
Greek Cypriot people
Association football defenders